Stockton Municipal Airport  is a city-owned, public-use airport located three nautical miles (6 km) southwest of the central business district of Stockton, a city in Cedar County, Missouri, United States.

Facilities and aircraft 
Stockton Municipal Airport covers an area of 162 acres (66 ha) at an elevation of 1,042 feet (318 m) above mean sea level. It has one runway designated 1/19 with an asphalt surface measuring 3,060 by 50 feet (933 x 15 m).

For the 12-month period ending December 31, 2011, the airport had 1,215 aircraft operations, an average of 101 per month: 83% general aviation and 17% military. At that time there were six single-engine aircraft based at this airport.

References

External links 
 Stockton Municipal (MO3) at Missouri DOT Airport Directory
 Aerial image as of March 1996 from USGS The National Map
 
 

Airports in Missouri
Cedar County, Missouri